Sakam may be,

Sakam language
Sakam Tower